'The Maroochy Music and Visual Arts Festival (MMVAF) is an Australian contemporary music festival that was first held in 2015 on the site of the former Horton Park Golf Course in Maroochydore, Queensland. The festival was created and promoted by a home-grown team to bring up-and-coming contemporary Australian music to the area alongside visual art installations and displays.

Artist lineups

2015 
The 2015 lineup was announced on 25 May 2015 with a 'secret headliner' which was later revealed to be coast locals Flight Facilities.

Music 
 Alpine
 DZ Deathrays
 Flight Facilities - 'Secret Headliner'
 Gang of Youths
 Harts (musician)
 Hermitude
 Hiatus Kaiyote
 The Kite String Tangle
 Marlon Williams and The Yarra Benders
 One Day
 WAAX

Visual Art 
 Amanda Parer
 Bertie Blackman
 Cekios
 Conrad Square
 Fuzeillear
 Gerard King
 Gus
 Jay Beez
 Susan Bohmer
 Thom Stuart
 Wintercroft (UK)
 The Zookeeper

2016 
The lineup for the 2016 event to be held 10 September 2016 has yet to be announced.

References 

Music festivals in Australia